Shelburn Interurban Depot-THI&E Interurban Depot is a historic interurban train station located at Shelburn, Sullivan County, Indiana. It was built about 1911 and enlarged between 1916 and 1920.  It is a one-story, red brick and limestone building that housed passenger and freight rooms and a substation for the electrical system that powered the interurban cars.  It was used for its original purpose until the closure of the interurban line between Terre Haute, Indiana and Sullivan in May 1931.

In 2015, the Town of Shelburn completed a full restoration of the depot exterior. The work included structural repairs, roof replacement and reconstruction, masonry cleaning and restoration, window and door replacement, and the installation of a new electrical service. Restoration work was completed by Keymark (Terre Haute, IN) to preservation plans provided by RATIO Architects (Indianapolis, IN).

It was listed on the National Register of Historic Places in 2015.

The Town completed the interior and exterior restoration and rehabilitation of the building in 2019 and is currently marketing the building for reuse as a restaurant and bar.

References

Railway stations on the National Register of Historic Places in Indiana
Railway stations in the United States opened in 1911
National Register of Historic Places in Sullivan County, Indiana
Transportation buildings and structures in Sullivan County, Indiana
Former railway stations in Indiana